The Pazzi Madonna  is a rectangular "stiacciato" marble relief sculpture by Donatello, now in the sculpture collections of the Bode-Museum in Berlin. Dating to around 1425-1430, probably it was produced originally for private devotion in the Palazzo Pazzi della Congiura in Florence at the beginning of Donatello's collaboration with Michelozzo. The work was extremely popular and is known in several copies.

The Virgin Mary is shown three-quarter-length, holding the Christ Child in her arms. Neither of them are shown with halos and the emphasis is instead on their tender and intense intimacy, developing themes from the Eleusa-type icon in Byzantine art. The smiling child reaches out his arm to his mother, but their expressions often are described as melancholy, with the suggestion that the Virgin is reflecting on her son's future Passion.

References

Marble sculptures
Sculptures by Donatello
Sculptures of the Berlin State Museums
Pazzi family